Iva Brkić (born 12 December 1985) is Croatian basketball player currently playing for Quesos el pastor, Spain as a point guard.

Early years
Iva was born in the town of Slavonski Brod, Croatia to parents Željko and Melita Ciglar. Her father Željko is a basketball coach. She has two brothers.

Iva's career started in her native country of Croatia with ZKK Medvescak from 2001 to 2004. She later played three years in the NCAA while attending Florida International University from 2005 to 2008. She has also played for Slovenia's Merkur Celje from 2008 to 2009 where she was an "All Star of the Slovenian League" and Hungary's Szeviep Szeged from 2009 to 2010.

Professional career
She is recovering about a very bad injury.

Personal life
In May 2016 she married for Croatian journalist Filip Brkić. In November the same year is revealed that she was pregnant.

References

External links
Profile at eurobasket.com

1985 births
Living people
Sportspeople from Slavonski Brod
Croatian women's basketball players
Basketball players at the 2012 Summer Olympics
Olympic basketball players of Croatia
Point guards
ŽKK Novi Zagreb players
Mediterranean Games bronze medalists for Croatia
Competitors at the 2009 Mediterranean Games
Mediterranean Games medalists in basketball